Pinhal Litoral is a former NUTS3 subregion of Portugal integrating the Centro Region. It was abolished at the January 2015 NUTS 3 revision. It covered an area of 1,741 km2, a population of 261,665 (as of 2005) and a density of 150 inhabitants/km2. It has a diversified economic activity, mainly glass, plastics, wood and agriculture.

Cities and towns
The main city is Leiria (pop.50,176 ;{63,000 in urban area}. Other cities are Marinha Grande (29,000) and Pombal (18,000).

Municipalities
It covers 5 municipalities:
Batalha [town]
Leiria  [city;area seat of Pinhal Litoral, capital of Leiria District, Leiria urban community and Leiria/Fátima Diocese
Marinha Grande [city]
Pombal  [city]
Porto de Mós [town]

References

Former NUTS 3 statistical regions of Portugal